Eulade Rudahunga was a Rwandan priest for the Roman Catholic Diocese of Butare in the Republic of Rwanda from August 2, 1953, to 2019.
He served as a chaplain for different parishes until he received the title of Monsignor by Pope John Paul II.

Rudahunga attended Kabgayi and Nyakibanda seminaries before receiving the ecclesiastical title of Padre.

He worked as a teacher and taught well-known Rwandan figures such as the late Juvénal Habyarimana, the former president of Rwanda.

Rudahunga was a survivor of the 1994 Rwandan genocide against the Tutsi. He survived by pleading with the killers and giving them some of the church savings to free himself and other refugees they hid with in the church.

References

20th-century Rwandan Roman Catholic priests
People from Butare
1918 births
2019 deaths
21st-century Rwandan Roman Catholic priests